{{Infobox company
| name   = Gruppo Torinese Trasporti
| logo   = Gruppo Torinese Trasporti logo.png
| logo_size = 202px
| image = GTT headquarters.jpg
| type   = Public benefit corporation
| foundation        = Turin, Piedmont - (Italy) (2003)
| founder           = 
| origins           = 
| key_people        = Paolo Golzio, chairman
Giovanni Foti, executive director
| location_city     = Turin
| location_country  = Italy
| location          = 
| area_served       = Metropolitan City of Turin
Province of Alessandria
Province of Cuneo
Province of Asti
| products           = Mass transit
| focus             = 
| method            = 
| revenue           = €403 million (2005)
| operating_income  = 
| net_income        = 
| assets            = 
| equity            = 
| num_employees     = 5500 (2005)
| divisions         = Holding
Trasporto pubblico locale
Metroferro
Infrastrutture ed ingegneria
| owner             = Comune di Torino 
| slogan = 
| homepage          = www.gtt.to.it
| dissolved         = 
| footnotes         = 
}}

The Gruppo Torinese Trasporti (GTT) is a public benefit corporation responsible for public transportation in the provinces of Alessandria, Cuneo, Asti and the Metropolitan City of Turin. It was created in 2003 from the merge of ATM (Azienda Torinese Mobilità) and SATTI (Società Torinese Trasporti Intercomunali), the latter responsible for railway connection in the province of Turin as well as for the Turin metro. GTT is now wholly owned by the Turin City Hall.

GTT manages the urban and suburban public transport (the Turin tram system, with 9 lines, and bus network of 84 lines), the Turin subway service and 3 railway lines (82 km, plus other 24 managed for Trenitalia). The Turin metropolitan area is also served by about 70 extra-urban bus lines, reaching 220 different municipalities (comuni). GTT also manages minor services, such as the Sassi-Superga historical tramway, the Mole Antonelliana elevator, the City Sightseeing and also the touristic navigation on Po River.

 GTT Railways 
In addition to the VAL Metro system, GTT operates two suburban commuter railways: the Ferrovia Canavesana and the Ferrovia Torino-Ceres.

 Ferrovia Canavesana 

The Ferrovia Canavesana connects the towns of Settimo, Volpiano, San Benigno Canavese, Bosconero, Feletto, Rivarolo Canavese, Favria, Salassa, Valperga, Cuorgnè and Pont Canavese to downtown Turin, having in Torino Porta Susa, the closest station to the city centre.

The Settimo station, just northern to Turin, is particularly important, in that it allows the interchange with the Turin-Milan and Turin-Aosta inter-regional railroads, operated by Trenitalia.

A bus shuttle in connection with the trains operates between Rivarolo Canavese station, Ozegna and Castellamonte.

A number of other stations within the city of Turin are served as well: Torino Stura, Torino Dora, Torino Porta Susa and Torino Lingotto. An additional station (Torino Zappata) is under construction. Leaving Torino Lingotto the railway line serves three additional stations in the Southern Metropolitan area of Turin: Moncalieri, Trofarello and Chieri. The section from Settimo Torinese to Trofarello utilizes the same tracks and stations of the Trenitalia lines.

 Ferrovia Torino-Ceres 

The Ferrovia Torino-Ceres (also known as Torino-Valli di Lanzo) is a commuter railway connecting the towns of Ceres, Lanzo Torinese, Cirié, Caselle Torinese and others to downtown Turin. , the closest station to the city centre is Torino Dora.

The section from Torino Dora to Porta Milano (close to Piazza della Repubblica and downtown Turin) operated from 1923 to 1985 but has long been discontinued, though a proposition for its reuse has recently been moved (2014). However, both this section and its continuation up to Madonna di Campagna train station will be discontinued in the near future, at least as part of the Torino-Ceres railway line. Overall, this whole section will be replaced by a new one running underground along Corso Grosseto'' and this new track will eventually reach Torino Rebaudengo Fossata so to join the Turin-Milan railway, locally called "Passante Ferroviario di Torino" ("Turin Railway Bypass").

A station linked to Turin International Airport by escalators opened for the 2006 Winter Olympic Games and realizes the first rail connection between Turin and its airport.

GTT Tramways

GTT owns ten tramway routes, one of which being the Sassi-Superga tramway. The historic route 7 where only heritage trams are operated by the Associazione Torinese Tram Storici, is not operated by GTT. The GTT routes are:

3 Piazzale Vallette-Corso Tortona
4 Via delle Querce-Strada del Drosso
9 Piazza Stampalia-Corso d'Azeglio
9/ Piazza Bernini-Juventus Stadium (operates only during Juventus FC games - currently suspended)
10 Feriale Corso Settembrini-Piazza Statuto (tram services are currently limited due to improvement works)
10 Festivo Piazzale Caio Mario-Via Massari (tram services are currently limited due to improvement works)
13 Feriale Piazza Campanella-Piazza Gran Madre
13 Festivo Via Servais-Piazza Campanella-Piazza Gran Madre
15 Via Brissogne-Piazza Coriolano (Sassi)
16 CD Piazza Sabotino-Piazza Repubblica (Porta Palazzo) (clockwise circular route)
16 CS Piazza Sabotino-Piazza Repubblica (Porta Palazzo) (anticlockwise circular route)
Venaria Express Turin-Reggia di Venaria Reale
Sassi-Superga tramway

Turin Metro

The line M1 of the Turin Metro, so far the system's only active line, connects the Fermi Station in Collegno to the piazza Bengasi district via Corso Francia, Porta Susa, and Porta Nuova, for a total of 23 stops.

GTT Bus Routes

GTT operates various bus routes in Turin, Moncalieri and the nearby suburbs, alongside the urban routes of the small town of Ivrea. Some routes are managed by GTT directly, while others are operated on a concessionary base by other operators such as Miccolis; Bus Company, SADEM by Arriva; Giachino; and Cavourese.

Urban and Suburban Bus Routes in Turin

2 Via Ponchielli-Via Corradino
5 Piazza dalla Chiesa (Orbassano)-Piazza Arbarello
5/ Via Bertani (Cimitero Parco)-Piazza Arbarello
6 Piazza Hermada-Piazza Carlo Felice
8 Piazza Mochino (San Mauro)-Piazzale Caio Mario
10 Navetta Via Massari-Piazza XVIII Dicembre
11 Piazza de Gasperi (Venaria Reale)-Corso Stati Uniti-Via Allason (Poste)
12 Via Allason (Poste)-Corso Vittorio Emanuele II
13 Navetta Via Servais-Piazza Campanella
14 Via Trento (Nichelino)-Piazza Solferino
17 Ospedale di Rivoli-Via Ventimiglia
17/ Via Crea (Grugliasco)-Via Ventimiglia
19 Corso Cadore-Corso Bolzano
19 Navetta Largo Donatori di Sangue-Cimitero Monumentale
20 Via Torre Pellice-Corso Vercelli (parcheggio Stura)
21 Via Fossata (Stazione Rebaudengo)-Via Lanzo
22 Corso Sebastopoli-Strada Cascinette
24 Via Vigliani-Strada Cascinette
25 Via Lombardia (Settimo Torinese)-Lungo Stura Lazio
27 Via Anglesio-Corso Bolzano
29 Piazzale Vallette-Piazza Solferino
30 Via Gozzano (Chieri)-Corso San Maurizio
32 Piazza Robotti (Alpignano)-Corso Tassoni
33 Corso Piazza Giovanni XXIII (Collegno)-Corso Vittorio Emanuele II-Piazzale Adua
34 Cimitero Parco/Strada Torino (Beinasco)-Via Ventimiglia
35 Via Amendola (Nichelino)-Via Artom
35 Navetta Via Verdi (Candiolo)-Villaggio Dega (Vinovo)-Via Trento (Nichelino)
36 Corso Francia/Don Murialdo (Rivoli)-Corso Francia/Via Fidia
36 Navetta Ospedale di Rivoli-Castello di Rivoli
38 Piazzale Caio Mario-Corso Maroncelli-Via Minghetti (Collegno)
39 Piazza Baden Baden (Moncalieri)-Piazzale Caio Mario
40 Piazzale Caio Mario-Piazza Massaua
41 Via Pannunzio (Stazione Lingotto)-Via Orbassano (Borgaretto)
42 Via Marsigli-Via Ventimiglia
43 Via Gorizia (Rivalta)-Via Goito (Moncalieri)
44 Via Portalupi (Collegno)-Via Don Borio (Grugliasco)
45 Piazza Carducci (Santena)-Piazza Carducci (Molinette)-Corso Maroncelli
45/ Piazza Cosma e Damiano (Santena)-Piazza Carducci (Molinette)
46 Via Lombardore/Viale Europa (Leinì)-Corso Bolzano
46 Navetta Park Stura-Borgata di Villaretto-Borgaro
47 Piazza Freguglia (Cavoretto)-Piazza Carducci
48 Ospedale San Luigi (Orbassano)-Via Orbassano (Beinasco-Borgaretto)
49 Via Lombardia (Settimo Torinese)-Corso Bolzano
50 Via delle Querce-Ospedale San Giovanni Bosco-Corso XI Febbraio
51 Corso Vercelli (Park Stura)-Corso Bolzano
52 Via Scialoja-Piazzale Adua
53 Ospedale San Vincenzo-Corso San Maurizio
54 Corso Gabetti-Strada Mongreno-Strada del Mainero-Piazzale Adua
55 Via Don Borio (Grugliasco)-Corso Farini
56 Corso Tirreno (Grugliasco)-Largo Tabacchi
57 Via Anglesio-Corso Bolzano
58 Via Allason (Poste)-Via Bertola
58/ Via Grosso-Via Bertola
59 Piazza Oropa (Druento)-Piazza Solferino
59/ Piazzale Vallette-Piazza Solferino
60 Via Paris-Corso Inghilterra
61 Via Mezzaluna (San Mauro)-Corso Vittorio Emanuele II
62 Piazza Sofia-Piazzale Caio Mario
63 Via Negarville-Piazza Solferino
63/ Piazzale Caio Mario-Stazione Lingotto
64 Via Napoli (Grugliasco)-Corso Vittorio Emanuele II
65 Via Servais-Piazza Bernini
66 Via Crea (Grugliasco)-Corso Farini
67 Piazza Marconi (Moncalieri)-Piazza Arbarello-Via Scialoja
68 Via Cafasso-Via Fréjus
69 Via Italia (Borgaro)-Piazza Stampalia
70 Piazza Failla (Moncalieri)-Corso San Maurizio
71 Via Farinelli-Corso Bolzano
72 / 72/ Corso Machiavelli (Venaria Reale)-Via Bertola
73 Via Bonsignore-Piazza Zara
74 Via Gorini-Via Ventimiglia
75 Piazzale Vallette-Largo Tabacchi
76 Via Olevano (Grugliasco)-Via de Amicis (Fermi, M1 Collegno)
77 Via Sandre (Venaria Reale)-Corso Cadore
78 Largo Casale-Strada Alta di Mongreno
79 Replacement and additional service of the Sassi-Superga tramway, then it continues to Baldissero
80 Piazza Caduti per la Libertà (Moncalieri)-Strada Moncalvo
81 Via delle Primule (Moncalieri)-Corso Maroncelli
82 Piazza Caduti per la Libertà (Moncalieri)-Strada Carpice (Moncalieri)
83 Via Goito-Movicentro (Trofarello)-Strada Bauducchi (Moncalieri)-Villastellone
84 Via Corradino-Strada Carpice (Moncalieri)
90 Via delle Querce-Via Biscaretti
91 Via della Cella-Piazzale Caio Mario
92 Ospedale Giovanni Bosco-Piazzale Caio Mario
93/ Piazza Mochino (San Mauro)-Corso Tazzoli
94 Piazza Statuto-Via Biscaretti
95 Stazione Lingotto-Corso Tazzoli-Via Rivalta (Grugliasco)
95/ Stazione Lingotto-Via Anselmetti-Via Biscaretti-Via Faccioli
96 Via Amendola (Nichelino)-Corso Tazzoli
97 Piazza Martiri della Libertà (Rivoli)-Via Biscaretti
98 Via Portalupi (Collegno)-Via Biscaretti
99 Piazza Carducci (Santena)-Via Piave
M1S Bus sostitutivo Metropolitana Piazza Bengasi-Via de Amicis (Fermi, M1 Collegno)
102 Navetta Cimitero Parco
CP1 Via de Amicis (Fermi, M1 Collegno)-Via Musinè (Pianezza)
SM1 Via Paganini (Settimo Torinese)-Via Mezzaluna (San Mauro)
SM2 Via Aosta (San Mauro)-Piazza Gramsci (San Mauro)
Navetta SFMA Stazione Borgaro-Stazione Porta Susa
Navetta Università Navetta Poli Universitari Via Giuria-Via Quarello
Rivoli Express Turin Piazza Castello-Stazione Porta Susa-Castello di Rivoli
SE1 Park Stura-Via Lombardia (Settimo Torinese)
SE2 Park Stura-Via Lombardia (Settimo Torinese)
VE1 Viale Giordano Bruno (Venaria Cimitero)-Via Monte Ortigara
VE2 Ospedale Nuovo Venaria-Via Iseppon
Star 1 Ospedale Gradenigo-Via Cavalli

Urban Routes in Ivrea

1 Bellavista-Ivrea FS-Ivrea (Piazza Freguglia)-Bollengo-Sant'Anna
1/ Feriale San Bernardo-Ivrea FS-Ivrea (Piazza Freguglia)-Albiano
1/ Festivo San Bernardo-Bellavista-Ivrea FS-Ivrea (Piazza Freguglia)-Albiano/Bollengo
2 / 2/ Feriale Burolo/Chiaverano-Ivrea Piazza Freguglia-Ivrea Porta Aosta-Samone
2/ Festivo Burolo/Chiaverano-Ivrea Piazza Freguglia-Ivrea Porta Aosta-Samone/Pavone
3 San Germano-Borgofranco-Ivrea Porta Aosta-Banchette-Pavone/Ivrea FS
4 Bellavista-Ivrea FS-Ivrea Movicentro-Ivrea (Piazza Freguglia)-Quartiere San Giovanni
5 Quassolo/Lessolo-Salerano-Banchette-Ivrea FS-Ivrea Piazza Freguglia-Ivrea via Chabod/Bacciana/Bienca
6 / 6/ Ivrea Via Saudino-Ivrea Piazza Freguglia-Ivrea FS-Samone-Colleretto Giacosa-Loranzè

Urban Routes in Chieri, Nichelino, Orbassano and Rivalta

1 Chieri Via Fratelli Cervi-Via Rocchette
2 Chieri Piazza Rossi (Pessione)-Via Vittorio Emanuele II
1 Nichelino Piazza Parco della Rimembranza-Via XXV Aprile
1 Orbassano Ospedale San Luigi (Orbassano)-Via Volturno (Orbassano)
2 Rivalta Via Vicuna-Via Griva

Interurban Routes

1068 Collegno-Condove
1085 Torino (Cap. vari)-Fiat Rivalta
1086 Rivoli-Trana-Giaveno	
1087 Rivoli-Avigliana-Ferriera
1091 Collegno-Rubiana
1099 Servizio Atipico Chiusa San Michele-Condove
1117 Collegno-Fiat Rivalta / Piossasco-Pianezza Valeo
1128 Borgata Adrit-S.Giorio-Bussoleno
1224 Bussoleno-Avigliana-Rivoli
1335 Rivoli-Grugliasco-San Mauro (STAB. NEW HOLLAND KOBELCO)
1432 None-Alpignano (Linea di Gronda)
1435 Torino-C.A.A.T.-SITO
1442 Nichelino-Torino-Ferriera (STAB.TEKSID)
1510 Torino-Orbassano-Cumiana / Cumiana-Pinerolo
1511 Torino-Orbassano-Giaveno / Giaveno-Piossasco
1514 Servizio operaio Fiat Mirafiori (Cumiana)
2009 Autolinea delle Langhe (Dir. Grinzane-Sinio)	
2014 Torino-Poirino-Alba
2016 Canale-Sommariva-Racconigi
2027 Canale-S.Damiano-Asti
2073 Linea operaia Borgo Aje-Cambiano-Santena-Villastellone-Carmagnola
2075 Trofarello-Fiat Rivalta
2103 Navetta Trofarello Movicentro-Moncalieri
2172 Autolinea delle Langhe (Dir. Monforte-Dogliani)
2183 Canale-Fossano
2354 Carignano-Santena-Cambiano
3006 Torino-Settimo-Vallecerrina-Casale
3023 Vallecerrina-Asti
3092 Torino-Forno / San Maurizio-Forno / Leinì-Settimo
3096 Gassino-Sciolze
3105 Chivasso-Asti
3106 Crescentino-Chivasso-Torino FCA
3107 Torino-Gassino-Chivasso-Piova' Massaia
3121 Castagneto Po-Chivasso
3131 Torino-Lombardore-Rivarolo
3132 Rivarolo-Castellamonte
3133 Torino-Ivrea
3160 Lanzo-Viu'-Usseglio
3165 Torino-Germagnano	
3166 Torino-Volpiano-San Benigno
3201 Torino-Varallo Sesia
3316 Chivasso F.S.-Rondissone
3321 Montalenghe-Foglizzo-Chivasso
3329 Cirie'-Torino (Fiat Mirafiori)
3331 Verrua Savoia-Crescentino-Brusasco
3381 Cuorgne'-Caselle (Alenia)
3382 Torino (C.so Marche)-Caselle ALENIA
3428 Servizio Scuolabus Comune di Rivarossa
3429 Servizio Scuolabus San Benigno-Volpiano-Chivasso
3502 Servizio Scuolabus San Maurizio-Castellamonte
3545 Linea operaia Carignano-Torino-Chivasso (P.I.Chi)
3950 Servizio Scuolabus Comune di Verolengo
3970 Germagnano-Ceres Sost. treno
4108 Ivrea-Vische-Chivasso
4147 Vialfre'-Castellamonte (Mercatale)
4151 Cossano-Ivrea	
4152 Silva-Vialfre'-Ivrea
4156 Andrate-Ivrea		
4512 Ivrea-Castellamonte-Valchiusella
4546 Albiano-Vestigne' (Scuolabus)	
4980 Servizio Scuolabus Comune di Vico Canavese
5095 Forno-Rivarolo
5134 Forno-Busano-Cuorgne'
5135 Rivarolo-San Benigno-Torino
5137 Rivarolo-Pont-Ceresole
5140 Pont-Valprato Soana
5141 Pont-Frassinetto
5143 Cuorgne'-Ivrea
5145 Rivarolo-Ivrea
5150 Castelnuovo Nigra-Cuorgne' Centro
5318 Castelnuovo Nigra-Castellamonte-Scarmagno
5319 Campo-Muraglio-Rivarolo-Bosconero (EATON LIVIA)
5322 Cuorgne'-Alpette
5379 Servizio Scuolabus Cirie'-Rivarolo
MEOR Linea Mercato Orbassano

See also 
 Superga Rack Railway
 Turin Metro
 Turin metropolitan railway service

References

2003 establishments in Italy
Companies based in Turin
Transport companies of Italy
Transport in Turin
Transport companies established in 2003